The Highland Theological College (HTC; Scottish Gaelic: Colaiste Diadhaireachd na Gaidhealtach) is located in Dingwall, Scotland. It is part of the University of the Highlands and Islands.

In 1994 the Highland Theological Institute was set up with the assistance of Moray College and based in a small building in its grounds. The initial staff team was made up of two Church of Scotland ministers Andrew McGowan and Hector Morrison.

In 1999 they moved to premises that had been acquired in the centre of Dingwall and the name was changed to Highland Theological College (HTC).

In 2006 it was approved by the General Assembly of the Church of Scotland as a college for the training of Church of Scotland ministers. Theologically, it is within the evangelical and Reformed Christian tradition.

Hector Morrison has been the principal since 2009.

In 2014 there were 141 students.

In 2015, the college opened a satellite site in Glasgow.

References

External links

Church of Scotland
Bible colleges, seminaries and theological colleges in Scotland
University of the Highlands and Islands
1994 establishments in Scotland
Educational institutions established in 1994
Dingwall